The Omaruru River is a major river crossing the Erongo Region of western central Namibia from East to West. It originates in the Etjo Mountains, crosses the town of Omaruru and the village of Okombahe, and reaches the sea a few kilometers north of Henties Bay. Inflows of the Omaruru are Otjimakuru, Goab, Spitzkop, Leeu and Okandjou.

The Omaruru is an ephemeral river with a mean run-off of roughly 40 million cubic metres per annum. Its palaeochannels form an underground delta of the Namib Desert.

References

Rivers of Namibia
Geography of Erongo Region
Geography of Otjozondjupa Region